James Matthew Valentine (born 1961) is an Australian musician, and radio and television presenter. As a saxophonist he was a member of Jo Jo Zep (1982), Models (1984–87) and Absent Friends (1989–90).

Biography 

James Matthew Valentine was born in 1961 in Ballarat. His father was a car salesman and his mother taught elocution and was a part-time radio announcer. He has two older brothers. He attended Ballarat Grammar School where he learned saxophone, he described his performances in the local area, "a really bad jazz rock fusion gig." In the early 1980s Valentine relocated to Melbourne to attend university, he later recalled "First year I spent studying, and then I started getting gigs, and I didn't pay much attention to uni after that because I wanted to be a jazz musician."

Valentine is also the author of a series of books for teenage boys, including the sci-fi novel trilogy JumpMan.

Musical collaborations 
In 1982 James Valentine joined Joe Camilleri's group, Jo Jo Zep.

Valentine, on saxophone, and Kate Ceberano (of I'm Talking), on lead vocals, were members of Diana Boss and the Extremes, a covers band which performed The Supremes material. Other members included James Freud (of Models) on bass guitar, Barton Price (also of Models) on drums and Zan Abeyratne (of I'm Talking, with Ceberano) on co-lead vocals. He described his experience, "The rhythm section of that band was The Models. When that finished, they asked me to go on tour with them and then I never left. All of a sudden I was in this pop band wearing black leather jackets."

Valentine joined Models in late 1984, when they relocated to Sydney and he played saxophone with them until 1987, the group broke up in June of the following year. As a member of Models he appears on their studio albums, Out of Mind, Out of Sight (September 1985) and Models' Media (October 1986).

Valentine joined Absent Friends on saxophone and clarinet in 1989, they recorded a lone album, Here's Looking Up Your Address (April 1990). He also worked for Wendy Matthews (ex-Models, Absent Friends) on her debut solo album, Émigré (November 1990).

Radio and TV presenter 
Valentine has been a radio and TV presenter. He was the host of The Afternoon Show on ABC TV, children's afternoon TV series, from February 1987 until 1990. He continued at the ABC as a presenter of TV TV. As a radio presenter he worked on 666 ABC Canberra and has also spent more than 20 years presenting the Afternoons show on ABC Radio Sydney and Upbeat, each Sunday morning on ABC Jazz. Valentine wrote and presented comedy sketches on air for the ABC's Humour Australia website.

Valentine narrated Come Dine with Me Australia from 2010 to 2013 and Celebrity Come Dine With Me Australia from 2012 to 2014. He took over from Wendy Harmer and Robbie Buck as host of ABC Radio Sydney's Breakfast from Monday 13 December 2021 after the pair ended their run on Friday 10 December 2021.

References 

General
  Note: Archived [on-line] copy has limited functionality.
Specific

External links
 
James Valentine It Takes Two biography
James Valentine ABC biography

1961 births
Living people
Australian radio personalities
Models (band) members
Absent Friends (band) members
Australian children's television presenters
Jo Jo Zep & The Falcons members
Australian saxophonists